Paterson True Blues was a professional U.S. soccer team founded in 1887 and disestablished after 1915.  The True Blues, based out of Paterson, New Jersey, are best known as one of the dominant soccer teams of its era and one of the first U.S. soccer dynasties.

History
In the late 19th century, the northern New Jersey area of Paterson, Kearny and Newark began producing dozens of talented teams which drew their rosters from the region's textile mills, the True Blues themselves were born in 1887.  Their first near success came in the 1894 American Football Association’s American Cup.  That year, Paterson went to the final before falling to the Fall River Olympics.  Paterson won its first Cup title in 1896 under manager Herbert Newton. They would be the only Paterson team to win the American Cup. Their second triumph came in 1908 guided by John Watt while the third was in 1913 with manager John Hall. In 1897, Paterson joined the National Association Football League, the top professional league in the U.S. at the time.  Paterson immediately established itself as the best in the league, taking the championship in its first season.  Paterson won its second league title the next season, but around the start of the 20th century, soccer in the U.S. went into a brief decline.  As a result, both the NAFBL and the American Cup were suspended.  The Cup resumed play in 1905 and the NAFBL in 1907.  They rejoined the NAFBL and remained in the league until 1915.  In December 1913, Paterson travelled to St. Louis to match up against the best of the St. Louis Soccer League.  They fell in their first game against an SLSL All Star team before defeated Columbian Athletic Club and tying St. Leo's, the city’s dominant team.  After finishing the 1914-1915 NAFBL season at the bottom of the standings with an 0-14-2 record, Paterson withdrew from the league.

Year-by-year

Honors
American Cup
 Winner (3): 1896, 1909, 1913
 Runner Up (4): 1894, 1897, 1906, 1908

League Championship
 Winner (2): 1898, 1899
 Runner Up (1): 1913

External links
 National Association Football League standings
 American Cup results

References

Defunct soccer clubs in New Jersey
National Association Football League teams
Sports in Paterson, New Jersey
1887 establishments in New Jersey
Association football clubs established in 1887